Best Days is the third studio album by American recording artist Tamela Mann, released on Mann's own independent record label Tillymann Music Group on August 14, 2012. Best Days debuted at number fourteen on the US Billboard 200 and topped the Top Gospel Albums chart, becoming Mann's highest charting album to date.

Chart performance
Best Days debuted at number fourteen on the US Billboard 200 with first week sales of 16,670 units. It also peaked at number one on the Top Gospel Albums chart, and number ten on the year-end chart. The following week the album sold 11,169 units 9,637 in its third, 10,286 in its fourth and 8,538 in its fifth week, bringing total sales to 56,300 units in just over a month. As of August 20, 2014, Best Days has sold 475,085 units in the US.

The album's lead single "Take Me to the King", written by Kirk Franklin was also commercially successful. It topped the Billboard Gospel Songs chart and reached the top ten of the Billboard Heatseeker Songs chart. It also appeared on the Billboard R&B/Hip-Hop Songs chart peaking at number forty-four. In 2014, "Take Me to the King" was certified Gold by the RIAA for sales exceeding 500,000 copies.

Track listing

Charts

Weekly charts

Year-end charts

References

2012 albums
Tamela Mann albums